The 2011 Lehigh Mountain Hawks football team represented Lehigh University in the 2011 NCAA Division I FCS football season. The Mountain Hawks were led by sixth-year head coach Andy Coen and played their home games at Goodman Stadium. They are a member of the Patriot League. They finished the season 11–2, 6–0 in Patriot League play to win the conference championship. They received the conference's automatic bid into the FCS playoffs where they defeated Towson in the second round before falling to North Dakota State in the quarterfinals.

Schedule

References

Lehigh
Lehigh Mountain Hawks football seasons
Patriot League football champion seasons
Lehigh
Lehigh Mountain Hawks football